This is a list of locations in the United States which have been reported to be haunted by ghosts or other supernatural beings, including demons.

States with several haunted locations are listed on separate pages, linked from this page. Many of them appeared on Ghost Adventures.

A

Alabama

The Boyington Oak in Mobile is a Southern live oak that reportedly grew from the grave of Charles Boyington in the potter's field just outside the walls of Church Street Graveyard. Boyington was tried and executed for the murder of his friend, Nathaniel Frost, on February 20, 1835. He said a tree would spring from his grave as proof of his innocence.
The Dr. John R. Drish House in Tuscaloosa has a tower that has reportedly been seen on numerous occasions to be on fire, when no fire was actually there. Also, ghostly lights are said to be seen emanating from the house.
Gaineswood in Demopolis is reportedly haunted by the ghost of a former housekeeper from Virginia. She was in charge of running the house for General Whitfield after the death of his wife. Her ghost supposedly plays the piano in the music room.
Kenworthy Hall near Marion has a fourth-floor tower room that is alleged to be haunted by the ghost of a young woman. She sits in a window awaiting the return of a lover who died during the American Civil War.
Edmund King House on the University of Montevallo campus in Shelby County is reported to be the site of spectral lights, the sound of footsteps, and other unexplained noises.
Pickens County Courthouse in Carrollton is alleged to be haunted by the ghost of a former slave, Henry Wells, who was lynched by a mob after being accused of burning down the second county courthouse. Soon afterward, the ghostly image of a face appeared in an upper window of the new third county courthouse to profess Wells' innocence. Supposedly, every windowpane in the courthouse was broken in a hailstorm one year, except for that pane.
Pratt Hall at Huntingdon College in Montgomery is reportedly haunted by a Red Lady. Huntingdon was originally a Methodist female college and the Red Lady is alleged to be the ghost of a lonely girl who committed suicide.
Sturdivant Hall in Selma is purported to be haunted by the ghost of the second owner, John McGee Parkman. Parkman, imprisoned by Reconstruction authorities for alleged embezzlement, died during an escape attempt from Cahaba Prison in 1867.
Sweetwater Mansion in Florence, Alabama, was built during 1828. Both Union and Confederate officers stayed there during their respective occupations of the city during the Civil War. Alleged paranormal activity has been investigated by local paranormal groups and a team from the television show Paranormal State.
The Tombigbee River near Pennington is reportedly haunted by the ghost ship Eliza Battle. The ship is supposed to return during especially cold, stormy nights to warn of impending disaster. Likewise, the former captain of the James T. Staples reportedly appears near the site of that disaster at Bladon Springs.

Alaska
Alaskan Hotel and Bar in Juneau.
West High School in Anchorage.

Arizona

 Bird Cage Theatre in Tombstone is reportedly haunted. These reports date back to the 1880s. It was investigated on Ghost Adventures in 2009 and on Ghost Hunters in 2006.
 Copper Queen Hotel in Bisbee is reportedly haunted. It was investigated on both Ghost Adventures and Ghost Hunters.
 Part of the football field at Lee Williams High School in Kingman lies atop an old Pioneer Cemetery. Women in prairie gowns and men wearing suits from the 19th Century have reportedly been sighted during outdoor graduation ceremonies.
 Monte Vista Hotel in Flagstaff is reputed to be haunted. A phantom bellboy is said to knock on the door of room 210 and announce "Room service." John Wayne reported seeing a ghost in his room while staying at the hotel in the early 1950s.
 Hotel San Carlos in Phoenix is filled with rumors that a 22-year-old girl jumped off the seven story hotel to her death after several weeks when the hotel first opened, along with other witnesses saying a girl mysteriously appearing at the foot of their beds for several seconds until she goes to their doors and vanishes.
The Yuma Territorial Prison in Yuma is reported to be haunted by multiple entities, including the spirit of a little girl in a red dress, death row inmates and others, and has been listed by USA Today as one of the 10 best haunted destinations in the USA.

Arkansas
 The Gurdon Light is a mysterious floating light above the railroad tracks near Gurdon (Clark County), a few miles away on Highway 67, which was first sighted during the 1930s. A popular legend is that a railroad worker was in an accident in which he was decapitated and now he is holding a lantern going up and down the tracks searching for his missing head. The other legend involves the murder of a foreman for the Missouri-Pacific Railroad. The Gurdon Light was reportedly sighted shortly after his murder near those tracks during 1931. The local legend appeared on NBC's television program Unsolved Mysteries during 1994.
The Crescent Hotel in Eureka Springs bills itself as America's most haunted hotel. It was featured on the television show Ghost Hunters in 2005.

C

California

California is the location of many supposedly haunted locations. Notable locations with reputations for being haunted include Alcatraz, the former ocean liner  in Long Beach, El Adobe de Capistrano in San Juan Capistrano, and the Winchester Mystery House.
 Henry Levy House in Oxnard, California, was featured on the TV series Ghost Adventures on Thanksgiving night 2022. The episode featured the 108-year-old, 4800-square-foot home once owned by Henry and Camille Levy, and her sister Juliette. Longtime neighbors were also featured in the episode, detailing their experiences with the "racist" Levy sisters. Homeowners Eric Andrist and Jeff Rizzo provided security camera footage of a locked door flying open and a creepy voice captured while the show's host, Zak Bagans, was filming on the second floor. Both Henry and Camille Levy died in the house.

Colorado
 Pioneer Park in Aspen is reportedly haunted by the ghost of Harriet Webber, wife of its builder, who died of what was ruled to be an accidental strychnine overdose during 1881, four years before it was built.
 Stanley Hotel in Estes Park Colorado, was built by a Massachusetts couple named F.O. and Flora Stanley. They lived there, and reportedly never left. Staff says Flora can be heard playing her piano at night. If you take a picture in the hotel, it is said Mr. Stanley can show up at any time in that picture. Children can be heard running up and down the halls. This lovely mountain resort in the Colorado wilderness was the inspiration for Stephen King's thriller, The Shining.

Connecticut

 Bara-Hack is a ghost town in the northern part of the state that is reportedly haunted.
 Daniel Benton Homestead is a historic house museum in Tolland, Connecticut. It is reputedly haunted by the ghosts of Hessian soldiers and 18th-century lovers Elisha Benton and Jemima Barrows, who tragically died from smallpox.
 Dudleytown is an abandoned town founded in the mid-1740s. It lies in the middle of a forested area in Cornwall. The original buildings are gone and only their foundations remain. Videos purport to show restless spirits in the area and hikers have reported seeing orbs in the area.
 Union Cemetery in Easton (also Bridgeport), which dates back to the 17th century, is touted as "one of the most haunted cemeteries in the entire country" by authors of paranormal books who claim that visitors have photographed orbs, light rods, ectoplasmic mists, and apparitions. A spirit known as the "White Lady" has also been reported.
Norwich State Hospital is a former psychiatric hospital spreading across a 70-acre campus. Before the majority of it was demolished, there were reports of lamenting patients near the Salmon building and the lobotomy room. It was featured on Ghost Hunters (TV series) season 6, episode 10.

District of Columbia

Several sites in Washington are reputedly haunted, including the Capitol Building, the White House, and the Octagon House (1801).

F

Florida

 Don CeSar Hotel in St. Petersburg Beach, Fla, reportedly is haunted by the ghost of its original owner, Thomas Rowe, who built the Moorish-style "Pink Palace" during 1926. The  story is that Thomas Rowe was forbidden to marry the love of his life, a singer in the opera Maritana, by her parents. He built the Don CeSar in remembrance of her, and named it after a character in the opera. "Time is infinite. I wait for you by our fountain", she wrote to him on her deathbed, and after his own death, it was reported that they were seen to be meeting by the fountain in the hotel lobby.
 House of Pedro Benedit Horruytiner, colonial governor of Florida, in St. Augustine. Alleged encounters with the Horruytiner ghost, as well as that of a cat supposedly killed in the house, have been reported there.
 The Leaf Theater in Quincy reportedly is haunted by several former movie operators and theater attendees
 The University of South Florida Library in Tampa reportedly is haunted.

G
Georgia
 Augusta State University in Augusta. 
 Ebos Landing (Igbo Landing) in Dunbar Creek, St. Simons Island, Glynn County is allegedly haunted by the souls of Igbo slaves who committed mass suicide by drowning there during 1803 to protest their enslavement.Haunted Plantations: Ghosts of Slavery and Legends of the Cotton Kingdoms, Geordie Buxton, Arcadia Publishing, 2007 p.63
 Moon River Brewing Company in Savannah is allegedly haunted by angry spirits. It was featured on the TV series Ghost Adventures.

H
Hawaii
 ʻIolani Palace is said to be haunted.

I
Idaho
 A security camera in the Pocatello High School captured a translucent figure going down a hallway and in and out of a bathroom when the school was closed for winter break in 2014. People report hearing voices in conversation and the sound of a piano inside the school's otherwise empty theater.

Illinois
 Bachelor's Grove Cemetery, Midlothian, Illinois was mentioned on Most Terrifying Places in America.  
 Former Chicago Historical Society Building is said to be haunted since its use as a temporary morgue for victims of the Eastland Disaster (1915).
 Former Anna State Hospital a Kirkbride Plan hospital in Anna.
 Crenshaw House in Equality. The house was constructed in the 1830s as a station on the Reverse Underground Railroad. In 1978, a reporter from Harrisburg named David Rodgers spent the night in the attic as a Halloween stunt for a local television station. The reporter managed to beat out nearly 150 previous challengers and became the first person to spend the night in the slave quarters in more than a century. Rodgers later admitted that he was 'queasy' going into the house and also said that his experience in the attic was anything but mundane. He heard many sounds that he could not identify and later, he would discover that his recorder picked up voices that he himself could not hear.

 Hull House, Chicago, Illinois was mentioned on Most Terrifying Places in America.  
 Manteno State Hospital, Manteno was mentioned on Most Terrifying Places in America.  
 Peoria State Hospital in Bartonville, Illinois. Originally named the Illinois Asylum for the Incurably Insane from 1907 to 1908, but later renamed to the Peoria State Hospital in 1909. An additional name for it is the "Bartonville Insane Asylum".

Indiana

There are several reputedly haunted sites in Indiana, including the Culbertson Mansion in the former shipbuilding town New Albany.

Iowa
E. H. Harrison House in Keokuk, Iowa

K
Kansas
 Brown Grand Theatre in Concordia has stories of a ghost that haunts the theater.

Kentucky

White Hall near Richmond in Madison County, owned by Cassius Marcellus Clay (1810 -1903), is said to be haunted by the ghosts of Clay, his former wife, and his son.

L
Louisiana
 Myrtles Plantation is allegedly home to several ghosts.

M
Maryland

 Chesapeake and Ohio Canal is said to have a few ghosts, including dead soldiers from the Battle of Ball's Bluff fought during the American Civil War haunting near the 33–34 mile mark, a lady ghost on the 2 mile level at Catoctin (between locks 28 and 29), a headless man haunting the Paw Paw Tunnel, and a ghost of a robber at the Monocacy Aqueduct carrying a lantern.

 Massachusetts 

 Lizzie Borden House
 Longfellow's Wayside Inn
Concord's Colonial Inn
Hawthorne Hotel
House of Seven Gables

Michigan
 Big Bay Point Light is reputedly haunted by the red-haired ghost of its first keeper, Will Prior.
 The Landmark Inn in Marquette supposedly has a room haunted by a librarian who lost her lover in a shipwreck.

Minnesota
 First Avenue in Downtown Minneapolis is said to be haunted by a woman who hung herself during World War II.
 Enger Tower in Duluth, is said to be haunted.
 Palmer House Hotel in Sauk Centre, was featured on an episode of Travel Channel's Ghost Adventures, and is said to be haunted.

Missouri
 Town of Avilla on historic Route 66 is said to have large numbers of Shadow Folk throughout village and also haunted by a Revenant Civil War-era bushwhacker nicknamed "Rotten Johnny Reb", from a gruesome historical event now known as the "Legend of the Avilla Death Tree".
 Vaile Mansion in Independence, Missouri is said to be haunted.
 Lemp Mansion in St. Louis, Missouri is said to be haunted.

Montana

 Bannack, a ghost town, was founded in 1862 and named after the Bannock Indian tribe. Several claims of hauntings have been made there, including the apparition of a woman in a blue gown named Dorothy who drowned in Grasshopper Creek. A gang of outlaws were also executed in the town and their ghosts are said to haunt the area. There were several epidemics of illnesses there as well, and a reported 8 to 14 infants died in the town.
Boulder Hot Springs Hotel, near Boulder, Montana is said to be haunted by "Simone", the ghost of a prostitute who was murdered at the hotel.
 Carroll College, in Helena, supposedly has a ghost in the men's restroom in St. Charles Hall, where a drunken student died of a cerebral hemorrhage after falling and smashing his head against a sink in the middle of the night. 
 The Copper King Mansion in Butte is said to be haunted by its original owner, Senator William A. Clark. The mansion also served as a Catholic convent during the early 1900s.
The Dude Rancher Lodge, Billings, is said to be haunted by one of its original owners, and also by a long-time cook. 
 Garnet, a ghost town in the Garnet Mountain Range about 40 miles outside of Missoula, is said to be haunted by several ghosts, including gold miners and a woman executed for murder there. 
 The Little Bighorn Battlefield, located near Hardin, is said to be haunted by the ghosts of both U.S. soldiers and Native Americans who participated in the battle.
 Montana Territorial Prison in Deer Lodge, Montana is said to be among the most haunted locations in the state. A number of deaths occurred there, including during a riot in 1959. Ghost researchers claim to have identified odd sounds and sensations, including voices and mists.
 Virginia City, a ghost town-turned-tourist-attraction, is said to be haunted. The saloon and theater are two areas of reported ghost sightings. The town had a violent past and was home to many outlaws. Calamity Jane lived in the town as a child.

N
Nevada
 The Nevada Governor's Mansion in Carson City was first occupied by the family of Governor Denver S. Dickerson during July 1909. Guests and staff have reported seeing a woman and child on the premises, thought to be Dickerson's wife Una and daughter June, the only child to have been born in the residence.

New Jersey
 Burlington County Prison in Mount Holly is reportedly haunted.
 Cape May is one of the oldest towns in America, established during 1620. It is also said to be one of the most haunted cities in the country, with many haunted 19th century style house bed & breakfasts, including Congress Hall, the Emlen Physick Estate, Peter Shields Inn, and Southern Mansion (featured on Ghost Hunters).  However, the town's best known haunt is Higbee Beach, famous for its quartz "Cape May diamonds", said to be haunted by a phantom black dog, or "hell hound", that is said to be cursed by Native Americans.
 The Essex County Hospital Center in Verona is believed to be haunted by full-body apparitions of nurses and patients.
 Leeds Point is the birthplace of the "Leeds Devil", better known as the Jersey Devil. The Pine Barrens (New Jersey) gave fame to the legend of the Jersey Devil, said to have been birthed by a local woman named Mrs. Leeds during 1735. It was her 13th child and she didn't want any more, so she cursed the child by saying, "May it be the devil!" Another version tells of Mother Leeds giving birth to a hideous horned monster that attacked her and her midwife, sprouted bat wings, and flew out through the chimney, disappearing into the Pine Barrens, which is where most of the alleged sightings have occurred.

New York

 112 Ocean Avenue House, (a.k.a. Amityville Horror House) in Amityville is the basis for the 1977 book The Amityville Horror by Jay Anson. It was the scene of a tragic mass murder of the DeFeo family on November 13, 1974, committed by Ronald DeFeo, Jr. The Lutz family, the next inhabitants of the home, claimed that it was haunted and fled after 28 days. Their experiences were described by Anson's bestselling book, which was followed by the 1979 movie The Amityville Horror. Despite accusations of fraud, the Lutzes maintained that they experienced paranormal phenomena while living in the Ocean Avenue home.
 Cherry Hill Estate, in southern Albany is a late 18th-century farm manor house that was the site of an 1827 murder that resulted in Albany's last public hanging after a controversial trial. An unidentified ghost has allegedly been seen on the property.
 New York State Capitol building in Albany is said to be haunted by the ghosts of a night watchman who died in a 1911 fire, artist William Morris Hunt, and others.

North Carolina

 The Attmore-Oliver House in New Bern has allegedly been the scene of some poltergeist-like activity stemming possibly from either deaths in the house during a smallpox epidemic or the spirit of the last private owner.
 Brown Mountain in Burke and Caldwell Counties is reputed to have ghostly orbs of light radiating from the mountain. According to local Cherokee legend, the "Brown Mountain Lights" date back as far as 1200. This was the year of a great battle, and they believed the lights to be the spirits of Native maidens who still search for lost loved ones. Also, there has been speculation of extraterrestrial activity. Wiseman's View on Linville Mountain is the best vantage point for viewing the lights. This lookout was used by a German engineer, William de Brahm during 1771 while studying the phenomenon. He attributed the lights to nitrous gases emitting from the mountain and combusting upon collision, but his theories were later disproven.
 The Carolina Theatre in Greensboro was set ablaze on July 1, 1981, by a woman who was assumed mentally disturbed. Melba Frey went up to the upper balcony and started the fire, which burned the entire balcony and lobby. Her body was found in the stairway by firefighters, and she is now believed to haunt the area in which she died, flipping the folding seats up and down.
 Fayetteville allegedly hosts ghosts such as "The Lady in Black" who haunts the Sandford House, formerly known as the Slocumb House. Her apparition first appeared in the late 19th century and has been sighted by members of The Woman's Club of Fayetteville.
 The Harvey Mansion Historic Inn and Restaurant in New Bern has claims of an older woman in 18th-century dress haunting the second and third floors.
 The Tar River, near Tarboro in Edgecombe County, is associated with a legend of a banshee. The legend speaks of a Patriot miller who was killed by a small group of British soldiers during the American Revolution. Before they drowned him in the river, he warned the soldiers that if he were killed, they would be haunted by a banshee. After his death, she appeared and caused the deaths of the soldiers and supposedly still haunts the river.
 The Roanoke Island was known for urban legend of Roanoke Colony that involves the mysterious disappearance of the colonists along with its local population during its colonization. The urban legend remains unsolved until today.

North Dakota
 The Liberty Memorial Building in Bismarck, according to former employees is said to be haunted by a ghostly presence nicknamed the "Stack Monster".
 Saint Anne's Guest Home, a Catholic health care facility in Grand Forks has a reputation for being haunted by the ghost of Sister Mary Murphy, who reportedly committed suicide by throwing herself from the bell tower in 1978.

O
Ohio
 Arnold's Bar and Grill, the oldest continuously operated bar in Cincinnati, is rumored to be haunted.
 Cincinnati Music Hall is a theater that was built over a potter's field. Reports of spirits on the property date back to 1876. During 1988, during the installation of an elevator shaft, bones of adults and children were exhumed from under the hall.
 Lima State Hospital for the Criminally Insane is said to be haunted by the ghost of Celia Rose, who murdered her family with rat poison. Robert Mihlbaugh, a special prosecutor investigating the facility, stated, "If hell has a basement it's the Lima State Hospital."
 Madison Seminary in Madison is an 88-room building that has been a school, a home, and an asylum for the insane. Figures move through locked doors, screams have been heard, and a killer may have buried his victim beneath the basement floor.

Oklahoma
 Dead Women Crossing in Weatherford allegedly has paranormal activities including a mysterious blue light that originates in the creek and a spectral woman crying for her baby around the area.

Oregon

There are a number of Reportedly haunted locations in Oregon. Reported hauntings in the state are linked to such historic places as the Oregon Trail and early coastal communities, as well as the history of Portland, the state's largest city and metropolitan area, which was considered one of the most dangerous port cities in the world at the beginning of the 20th century.  During 2012, USA Today named Portland among the top ten most haunted cities in the United States.

Allegedly haunted locales in Portland include the Bagdad Theater, a vaudeville theater built by Universal Studios during 1927; Pittock Mansion, a mansion overlooking the city; the Roseland Theater, a former church and music venue; and the city's Portland Underground (or so-called shanghai tunnels), made up of various passages beneath the streets of northwest Portland that were used to smuggle prostitutes and sailors onto ships in the port, where they were often sold into slavery or forced labor.

P
Pennsylvania

Pennsylvania has many locations that are reported to be haunted, including
the town of Gettysburg (site of the Civil War battle of the same name) and, in the vicinity of Philadelphia, such places as 
Cliveden Manor, the First Bank of the United States, Fort Mifflin, Library Hall, Pennsylvania Hospital, and Powel House.

S

South Carolina
Many areas in South Carolina are reportedly haunted. This stems from the state's historic role in the Revolutionary and Civil wars. Charleston is considered by many to be the most haunted city in the state, and some even venture as far as to say it is the most haunted city in America.  
 Pawleys Island is said to be haunted by a Gray Man, who appears shortly before dangerous storms to warn the inhabitants.

T
Tennessee
 The town of Adams was the site of the Bell Witch haunting, as well as the Bell Witch Cave.
 The Carnton Mansion in Franklin was used as a hospital for Confederate Soldiers during the Civil War. Many of the deceased here were buried in mass graves and some of their ghosts are alleged to haunt the site.
 The Orpheum Theatre in Memphis is said to be haunted by the ghost of a small girl who was killed in a car accident in front of the theater.

Texas
 The Menger Hotel is located in San Antonio, Texas. It is part of the Historic downtown district; opened for business in February 1859.
 The Driskill Hotel in Austin has several stories associated with it, and has been called the most haunted spot in Texas. 
 The Marfa lights have been attributed to haunting.  In May 2004, students from the Society of Physics Students at the University of Texas at Dallas spent four days investigating and recording lights observed southwest of the view park using traffic volume monitoring equipment, video cameras, binoculars, and chase cars. The conclusion was that all of the lights observed over a four night period southwest of the view park could be reliably attributed to automobile headlights traveling along U.S. 67 between Marfa and Presidio, Texas.

  in Corpus Christi. A uniformed sailor helps lost guests find their way back to the deck and a sailor in the engine room gives a lecture on how the turbines work before vanishing into thin air.
 The commissary at the Houston Zoo may be haunted by the first zookeeper, Hans Nagel, who was shot by a park police officer during late 1941 after being caught spying on teenagers in a parked car.
 Steven Spielberg's inspiration for Poltergeist may have come from his stay at the Excelsior Hotel in Jefferson. Spielberg threw his briefcase on a chair in the hotel's Jay Gould room and is said to have been surprised when unseen hands tossed it back at him. He also reportedly woke up during the night to see a young boy standing by his bed, who asked him if he was ready for breakfast.
 Old Town Spring in Texas is located just north of Houston. There is a curse upon the land. One that has troubled the inhabitants since the 1700s. A curse cast by the Akokisa tribe, also known for their cannibalism. There is a fearful respect for the land and the trees here. Fear being the key word. I’d even go so far as to call many of the shop owners “tree huggers,” especially the ones who have built their stores around the trees to avoid the curse. The numerous fires in the town have been linked to the land owners disturbing the trees.
U
Utah
 Alfred McCune Home on Capitol Hill in Salt Lake City.
 Cottonwood Paper Mill in Salt Lake City
 Harold B. Lee Library at Brigham Young University in Provo.
 Kay's Cross in Kaysville. It was investigated by Ghost Adventures.

V
Virginia
 A house at Bremo Recess in Bremo Historic District in Bremo Bluff, is reportedly haunted by Anne Blaws Barraud Cocke, the wife of John Hartwell Cocke, brigadier general in the War of 1812 and builder of the plantation estate.

W
Washington
 The former Burnley Professional School of Art in the former Booth Building at 905 E Pine Street (now a part of Seattle Central College) is said to be haunted by the spirit of a young man who died falling down the rear steps (although no documentary evidence of this accident exists). The ghost is said to manifest itself by "doors opening by themselves, sounds of disembodied footsteps, phones dialed by unseen fingers, coffee percolating without human assistance.
 The Harvard Exit Theatre in Capitol Hill, Seattle, WA is said to be haunted by the ghost of a beautiful woman who is sometimes seen crying.
 The parsonage of First Methodist Protestant Church of Seattle in Capitol Hill, Seattle, WA is said to be haunted by the ghost of Susannah Bagley, wife of pioneer preacher and Territorial University (now the University of Washington) founder Daniel Bagley. One reported sighting "in a diaphanous flowing gown, surrounded by a bluish light. When she asked, "How do I get out?''" he pointed to the door, but she serenely floated out the upstairs window instead."
 Ye College Inn in Seattle's University District is said to be haunted by "Howard," a beer-drinking ghost who habitually wears a tan trench coat.

West Virginia
Elizabeth Moore Hall On the campus of West Virginia University, is said to be haunted.

Wisconsin
 The Pfister Hotel in downtown Milwaukee is said to be haunted.
 Science Hall at the University of Wisconsin - Madison is said to be haunted.
 Memorial Library at the University of Wisconsin - Madison is said to be haunted.

Wyoming
 Occidental Hotel - In Buffalo, is reported to be haunted. It appeared on an episode of The Dead Files for Travel Channel. 
 Wyoming Frontier Prison - In Rawlins, is said to be haunted. The location was featured in season eight of Travel Channel's Ghost Adventures.
 Wyoming Territorial Prison - In Laramie. It was built in 1872, and is said to be haunted. 
 Fort Laramie - near Torrington, was a major stop along the Oregon Trail, and is said to be haunted.
 The Sheridan Inn - in Sheridan, is reported to be haunted by several spirits, including a former caretaker.

See also
 List of reportedly haunted locations in Canada
 Reportedly haunted locations in the United Kingdom 
 List of ghosts

References

External links

 
Lists of places in the United States
United States